Banff Springs may refer to:

 Banff Springs Hotel, in Banff, Alberta
 Banff Springs snail
 Banff Upper Hot Springs, in the Banff National Park